Manuel Rui Azinhais Nabeiro (28 March 1931 – 19 March 2023) was a Portuguese entrepreneur. He was the founder of the Delta Cafés group.

Biography 
Nabeiro helped his mother in a small grocery store and his father and uncles in coffee roasting, at a time when the effects of the civil war in Spain were felt and the border area was a place of smuggling.

A market leader in the coffee business, he established Novadelta in 1982, and in 1984, he created a new coffee roasting factory, which was the largest on the Iberian Peninsula at the time.

Awards 
On 9 June 1995, Mário Soares awarded him the rank of Commander of the Civil Order of Agricultural, Industrial, and Commercial.

References 

1931 births
2023 deaths
Portuguese businesspeople
Portuguese billionaires
Socialist Party (Portugal) politicians
People from Portalegre District
Commanders of the Order of Prince Henry